Asian Highway 66 (AH66) is a road in the Asian Highway Network running  from Qarasu Border Port, Xinjiang, China to Dushanbe, Tajikistan connecting AH4 (Chinese Road 314 (Karakoram Highway)) to Dushanbe. The route is as follows:

China
 Qarasu Border Port

Tajikistan
   РБ04 Road : Kulma Pass -  Murghab - Khorugh - Kalaikhumb - Vahdat - Dushanbe

Asian Highway Network
Roads in Tajikistan
Roads in China
Roads in Xinjiang